Phiala aurivillii is a moth in the family Eupterotidae. It was described by George Thomas Bethune-Baker in 1915. It is found in Zambia.

The wingspan is 58 mm. The forewings are greyish white, with a broad stripe of black scales filling the cell and beyond it. There is an oblique curved stripe of similar scales in the postmedian area and a trace of a subterminal one much interrupted. The hindwings are greyish white, with a slight patch of thin grey scales in the cellular area and a trace of a scaled greyish postmedial stripe.

References

Endemic fauna of Zambia
Moths described in 1915
Eupterotinae